The ASH 25 is a two-seater high performance Open Class glider manufactured by Alexander Schleicher from 1986 until September 2008, originally with a 25-metre wingspan. It was superseded in production by the ASH 30.

Design and development
In 1984, designer Martin Heide (the 'H' in the type designation) combined the wing of the World Championship winning single-seater Schleicher ASW 22 with a fuselage derived from the Akaflieg Stuttgart fs31 which had particularly low drag. The prototype was designated AS 22-2. The span was increased in later versions to 25.6 or 26 metres with winglets.

A 'turbo' version was also developed, the ASH 25E, followed by the self-launching ASH 25 Mi with a large retractable propeller and a Wankel engine.

Variants
ASH 25A 25m Open class glider, 25.6m or 26m wingspan when fitted with option winglets.
ASH 25ESelf-sustaining version with a 24 hp Rotax 275 engine
ASH 25MSelf-launching version with a 60 hp AE50R engine. Both the ASH 25 and ASH 25E can be converted to the ASH 25M by the manufacturer.
ASH 25 MiSelf-launching version with a 60 hp IAE50R-AA engine. The ASH 25, ASH 25E and ASH 25M can be converted to the ASH 25Mi by the manufacturer.
ASH 25JSelf-launching version with a jet engine
ASH 25EBSelf-launching version with a Rotax 535C engine, 27m wingspan and one-piece canopy
ASH 25EB/28Self-launcher with one-piece canopy and 28m wingspan

Specifications (with 25.6 metre wings)

See also

References

Further reading

External links

Schleicher website
Sailplane Directory

1980s German sailplanes
ASH 25
Motor gliders
T-tail aircraft
Shoulder-wing aircraft
Single-engined tractor aircraft
Aircraft first flown in 1986